Barwuah is a surname. Notable people with the surname include:

Baffour Adjei Bawuah (born 1942), Ghanaian diplomat and politician
Mario Balotelli Barwuah (born 1990), Italian footballer 

Ghanaian surnames